= Da Silva (footballer, born 1984) =

Brazilian footballer

Personal information
- Full name: Albadilon da Silva Carvalho
- Date of birth: July 6, 1984 (age 42)
- Place of birth: Londrina, Brazil
- Height: 1.73 m (5 ft 8 in)
- Position: Central defender

Youth career
- 2002–2003: Paraná

Senior career*
Years	Team	Apps	(Gls)
2004–2006	Paraná	4	(0)
2007	Francisco Beltrão (Loan)		
2008	Social		
2009	São José		
- * Club domestic league appearances and goals

Albadilon da Silva Carvalho (born July 6, 1984), or simply Da Silva, is a Brazilian footballer

== Contract ==
- Francisco Beltrao (Loan) 6 June 2007 to 6 September 2007
- Paraná 1 March 2003 to 31 December 2007
